Michael Gould (born 3 May 1961, in Ealing) is a British actor.

Selected work

Stage
In Extremis (Shakespeare's Globe, 2007)
Othello, as Iago, Kathryn Hunter's touring Royal Shakespeare Company production, 2009
Hamlet, as Polonius, Ian Rickson's staging at the Young Vic, with Michael Sheen, 2011
The Writer (Almeida Theatre, 2018)
Vassa (Almeida Theatre, 2019)
All of Us (Royal National Theatre, 2022)

TV and film
 Mary Shelley's Frankenstein (1994) - Stablehand
 The Long Walk to Finchley (2008, TV Movie) - John Miller
 Private Peaceful (2012) - Mr. Monks
 Silent Witness episode: "Coup de Grace" (2 parts) (2014) - Peter Masham
 National Theatre Live: A View from the Bridge (2015) - Alfieri
 Our Kind of Traitor (2016) - Hugh Greenwood
 Rogue One (2016) - Admiral Gorin
 The Trial: A Murder in the Family (2017, TV Series documentary) - Simon Davis
 Darkest Hour (2017) - Lord Londonderry
 Radioactive (2019) - Judge Clark
 I Am Maria (2021) - John

References

External links

Living people
1961 births
English male stage actors
English male television actors
Place of birth missing (living people)
21st-century English male actors